Haft Peykar ( Haft Peykar) also known as Bahramnameh (The Book of Bahram, referring to the Sasanian king Bahram Gur) is a romantic epic by Persian poet Nizami Ganjavi written in 1197. This poem forms one part of his Khamsa. The original title in Persian Haft Peykar can be translated literally as "seven portraits" with the figurative meaning of "seven beauties". Both translations are meaningful and the poet doubtless exploited intentionally the ambiguity of the words. The poem was dedicated to the Ahmadili ruler of Maragha, Ala-al-Din Korpe Arslan bin Aq-Sonqor. The poem is a masterpiece of erotic literature, but it is also a profoundly moralistic work.

Story 
The Haft Peykar consists of seven tales. Bahram sends for seven princesses as his brides, and builds a palace containing seven domes for his brides, each dedicated to one day of the week, governed by the day's planet and bearing its emblematic color. Bahram visits each dome in turn, where he feasts, drinks, enjoys the favors of his brides, and listens to a tale told by each.

Editions and translations 
A critical edition of the Haft Peykar was produced by Helmut Ritter and Jan Rypka (Prague, printed Istanbul, 1934) on the basis of fifteen manuscripts of Khamsa and the Bombay lithograph. There is also an uncritical edition by Wahid Dastgerdi (Tehran, 1936 and reprints) and an edition by Barat Zanjani (Tehran, 1994). More recently, the poem was re-edited by the Azerbaijani scholar T. A. Maharramov (Moscow, 1987). 

A poetic German translation of a passage from the poem named Bahram Gur and Russian princess by orientalist  was published in 1832 in Kazan.

There are three complete translations in western European languages from original Persian language. First, in 1924 Charles Edward Wilson translated the poem to English in two volumes with extensive notes. Second, Alessandro Bausani in 1967 translated it to Italian. Finally, there is an English version by Julie Scott Meisami published in 1967. There is also an English metatranslation by E. Mattin and G. Hill (Oxford, 1976). A partial translation was also made by Rudolf Gelpke in German prose (Zurich, 1959).

Cultural influence 
In the early 1940s, to mark the 800th anniversary of Nizami Ganjavi, Azerbaijani composer Uzeyir Hajibeyov planned to write seven songs for the seven beauties of the poem. However, he only wrote two songs: "Sensiz" ("Without You", 1941) and "Sevgili Janan" ("Beloved", 1943).

In 1952 Azerbaijani composer Gara Garayev composed the ballet Seven Beauties based on motifs of Nizami Ganjavi's Seven beauties.

In 1959 a fountain with a bronze sculpture "Bahram Gur" depicting the hero of the poem killing serpentine dragon at his feet was erected in Baku.

In 1979 the Nizami Gəncəvi subway station in Baku was decorated by Azerbaijani painter Mikayil Abdullayev with mosaic murals based on the works of Nizami. Three of these murals depict heroes of the Seven Beauties poem.

The opera Turandot by Giacomo Puccini is based on the story of Tuesday, being told to King Bahram by his companion of the red dome, associated with Mars.

Gallery

See also
Hasht-Bihisht

References

Sources 
  François de Blois. Haft Peykar // Encyclopædia Iranica. — 15 December 2002. — V. XI. — pp. 522–524.

1197 works
Persian poems
Erotic literature
Epic poems in Persian
Memory of the World Register in Iran